Ai-Cham is a Kam–Sui language spoken mainly in Diwo 地莪 and Boyao 播尧 Townships, Jialiang District, Libo County, Qiannan Prefecture, Guizhou, China. Alternative names for the language are Jiamuhua, Jinhua and Atsam. Fang-Kuei Li first distinguished the language in 1943. Nearby languages include Bouyei and Mak. However, Yang (2000) considers Ai-Cham and Mak to be different dialects of an identical language.

Ai-Cham has six tones. Regarded of speaker's nationality, they are being subsumed under "Bouyei" nationality (same with speakers of Mak language).

The mythical patriarch and hero of the Ai-Cham people is the demigod Wu Sangui, who is celebrated during the Ai-Cham New Year.

References

 Edmondson, J. A., & Solnit, D. B. (1988). Comparative Kadai: linguistic studies beyond Tai. Summer Institute of Linguistics publications in linguistics, no. 86. [Arlington, Tex.]: Summer Institute of Linguistics. .
 

Kam–Sui languages
Languages of China